James Dickenson (1908–1982) was an English professional footballer. A left half or left back, he played in the Football League for Hartlepools United, Oldham Athletic and Torquay United.

References

1908 births
1982 deaths
Footballers from County Durham
Association football wing halves
Association football fullbacks
English footballers
Murton A.F.C. players
Easington Colliery A.F.C. players
Hartlepool United F.C. players
Blackpool F.C. players
Oldham Athletic A.F.C. players
Torquay United F.C. players
Scarborough F.C. players
Darlington Town F.C. players
English Football League players
People from Pittington